Gert Puzicha (25 January 1944 – 19 January 2012) was a German boxer. He competed in the men's light welterweight event at the 1968 Summer Olympics. Puzicha committed suicide in 2012 by drowning himself in the Ruhr.

References

External links
 

1944 births
2012 suicides
German male boxers
Olympic boxers of West Germany
Boxers at the 1968 Summer Olympics
People from Coesfeld
Sportspeople from Münster (region)
Light-welterweight boxers
Suicides by drowning in Germany